Ivan Fedorovich Yankovich de Mirievo (before 1777–6 June 1811) was an Imperial Russian soldier who saw service in the Napoleonic Wars.

Yankovich was born sometime before 1777, the son of renowned educational reformer Teodor Janković de Mirievo, a Serbian immigrant and member of the Russian Academy ennobled by Catherine the Great. The younger Yankovich began his military career in 1795 in the Life Guard Horse Regiment, the unit in which he remained until his death.

He participated in the War of the Third Coalition, during which he fought at the Battle of Austerlitz. He later fought against the French in the War of the Fourth Coalition and the Swedish in the Finnish War as commander of the Life Guard Horse Regiment. In early 1811 Yankovich was promoted to Lieutenant General and given command of the Light Guards Cavalry Division. Unfortunately, in June of that year he fell ill and died while traveling from Saint Petersburg to Cherkasy, just 12 months before the French invasion of Russia took place.

See also
Serbs in Russia
Mikhail Miloradovich
Georgi Emmanuel
Nikolay Depreradovich
Ilya Duka
Ivan Shevich
Ivan Adamovich

References 

1811 deaths
Imperial Russian Army generals
Russian military personnel of the Napoleonic Wars
People from the Russian Empire of Serbian descent